Stefano Farina (19 September 1962 – 23 May 2017) was an Italian association football referee.

Career 
Farina was born in Ovada on 19 September 1962. In a 27-year career, he refereed several high-profile matches in Serie A and the UEFA Champions League, including the 2006 UEFA Super Cup final in Monaco between Barcelona and Sevilla. During this time, he also had an appearance in the movie Goal II as the referee of the fictional Champions League final between Real Madrid and Arsenal. He officiated UEFA's preliminary FIFA World Cup matches in the 2002 FIFA World Cup qualification, the 2006 FIFA World Cup qualification, and also in qualifiers for the European Championship, such as the UEFA Euro 2004 qualification, as well as the UEFA Euro 2008 qualification. He is known to have served as a FIFA referee during the period from 2001 to 2007.  Farina retired internationally in 2007 after reaching the mandatory retirement age of 45. He was inducted into the Italian Football Hall of Fame in 2017.

Death 
Farina died in Genova on 23 May 2017, aged 54.

References

External links 
 Farina Honoured at Monaco Date

1962 births
2017 deaths
Italian football referees
People from Ovada
Sportspeople from the Province of Alessandria